Davide Tonani (born 13 May 1992) is an Italian footballer who plays for Unione La Rocca Altavilla.

Biography

Youth career
Born in Mede, Lombardy, Tonani joined Lombardy side F.C. Internazionale Milano in 2005. He played from Giovanissimi Regionali under-14 team to Allievi Nazionali under-17 team in 2009. He scored 12 goals in regular season, behind Simone Dell'Agnello and Giuseppe Angarano as third highest scorer of the team. The team finished as the runner-up. In August 2009 Inter decided to sell him to Chievo along with Filippo Fracaro (free), Edile Micheletti Awoh (loan) and youngster Francesco D'Ascanio (outright deal). He was the member of Primavera under-20 team along with Fracaro and Micheletti Awoh. In June 2010 he was signed in co-ownership deal for a peppercorn fee of €500. On 22 June 2011 Chievo signed Tonani and Rincón outright, while Michele Rigione joined Inter outright. Marco Andreolli also bought back by Chievo.

Pro Vercelli
On 19 August 2011 he joined Pro Vercelli in another co-ownership deal. He made his league debut on 25 September, substituted Pietro Iemmello in the second half. He also played in Campionato Berretti, the Lega Pro equivalent of Primavera League.

References

External links

Davide Tonani at Tuttocampo

1992 births
Living people
Italian footballers
Association football forwards
Sportspeople from the Province of Pavia
Footballers from Lombardy
A.C. ChievoVerona players
F.C. Pro Vercelli 1892 players
Alma Juventus Fano 1906 players
S.S.D. Pro Sesto players
Milano City F.C. players
Serie C players
Serie D players
Eccellenza players